The Teman Mono-Fly is an American ultralight aircraft that was designed by structural engineer Bob Teman and produced by Teman Aircraft Inc. The aircraft was supplied as a kit for amateur construction and later as a factory-completed aircraft.

Design and development
It features a strut-braced high-wing, a single-seat, open cockpit, tricycle landing gear and a single engine in pusher configuration.

The aircraft is made from aluminum tubing that is pop riveted together using gussets. On early examples the flying surfaces were covered in dope and aircraft fabric covering, but this was later changed to heat-shrunk Dacron sailcloth, to save weight. Its  span wing employs a modified Clark Y airfoil. The wings are supported by a single lift strut and a jury strut. The pilot is accommodated on an open seat, without a windshield. The controls are conventional three axis, but the aircraft uses a control yoke rather than the more common control stick. The landing gear features main wheel bungee suspension.

Early kit-built examples came out with empty weights too high for the FAR Part 103 limit, so the factory stopped supplying kits and produced completed aircraft instead. An Onan  four stroke industrial engine was also used, although this limited the rate of climb to 400 ft/min (2.0 m/s).

Reviewer Andre Cliche described the Mono-Fly as "well engineered". It is stressed to +10/-10g.

Specifications (version)

References

External links
Photo of a Mono-Fly with cockpit fairing fitted

1980s United States ultralight aircraft
Homebuilt aircraft
Single-engined pusher aircraft